Come Get to This is a studio album by American singer Nancy Wilson, released by Capitol Records in June 1975. Gene Page did the arrangements and conducting, and co-produced the album with his brother Billy Page. One of several R&B-oriented albums that Wilson recorded during the 1970s, Come Get To This included musicians such as Ray Parker Jr. and members of The Crusaders, along with songs written by Marvin Gaye, Leon Ware & Pam Sawyer, and Gene & Billy Page.

Andy Kellman at AllMusic said, "Wilson offers lush and expressive R&B [that should] disarm skeptics from both sides of the pointless jazz/R&B divide," and that the album "should not have been out of print for so long."

Come Get to This reached No. 14 on Billboard's Soul chart and No. 119 on the Billboard 200.

In 2011, SoulMusic Records released a digitally remastered version of the album, paired with All in Love Is Fair, Wilson's previous album, which was also produced by Gene Page.

Track listing

Side 1 

 "Come Get to This" (Marvin Gaye) – 3:00
 "All My Love Comes Down" (Billy Page, Gene Page) – 4:03
 "Don't Let Me Be Lonely Tonight" (James Taylor) – 3:21
 "If I Ever Lose This Heaven" (Leon Ware, Pam Sawyer) – 4:35
 "Happy Tears" (Page, Page) – 4:06

Side 2 

 "Houdini of the Midnite Hour (Page, Page) – 3:27
 "This Time Last Summer" (Jimmy Webb) – 4:00
 "He Called Me Baby" (Harlan Howard) – 3:51
 "Like A Circle Never Stops" (Page, Page) – 3:30
 "Boogeyin' All The Way" (Page, Page) – 3:22

Personnel 
From the original liner notes:

 Nancy Wilson – vocals
 Wilton Felder – bass
 Eddie Greene – drums
 Joe Sample – keyboards
 Bobbye Hall – congas
 Gary Coleman – percussionist
 Ray Parker Jr. – guitar
 Don Peake – guitar
 Melvin Ragin – guitar
 David T. Walker – guitar
 Mike Melvoin – Yamaha
 Michel Rubini – arp
 George Bohanon – trombone solo
 Bud Brisbois – trumpet solo
 Gene Cirpiano – English horn soloist
 William Green – oboe soloist
 Dick Hyde – baritone horn soloist
 Ernie Watts – tenor saxophone and flute solos
 Marti McCall – background vocals
 Jackie Ward – background vocals
 Carolyn Willis – background vocals
 Jim Gilstrap – background vocals
 Augie Johnson – background vocals
 John Lehman – background vocals

Technical personnel
 Gene Page – producer, arrnager, conductor
 Billy Page – producer, background vocals arranger
 Larkin Arnold – executive producer
 Olivia Page – production coordinator
 David Hassinger – recording engineer
 Roy Kohara – art director
 David Alexander – photographer

References 

1975 albums
Nancy Wilson (jazz singer) albums